The Karai or Qarai Turks are a Turkic minority mostly found in Khorasan and Iran especially Torbat-e Heydarieh. 

At the start of the Qajar dynasty, Qarai Turks were also scattered even beyond southern Khorasan through the desert zone of Sistan. Malcolm (1829) thought the Karai of Persia arrived from "Tartary" as a result of Timur's campaigns.
Under Afsharid Nader Shah (r. 1736–1747), they were settled in Khorasan.
Before that time, the Karai seem also to have been found in Azerbaijan.
Adam Olearius, who traveled in Azerbaijan in 1638, mentions Karai as one of the tribes of Mogan.

Origins
Their name (meaning "black") may ultimately derive from the Keraites, a Turco-Mongol polity in 11th-century Central Asia absorbed into the Mongol Empire and participating in the Mongol invasions of the 13th century, but may also be connected to those of various other Central Asian groups. 

Since "Black" (qara) is a Turkic designation for "north" it was a frequently used tribal identifier among the early Turkic peoples, and there are numerous Kipchak groups known by this adjective. The earliest mention of these, not necessarily related, are the "Black Tatars", a subdivision of the Rouran Khaganate in Tang sources. Meanwhile, at the western end of the steppe more "black Tatars" were the Tatar troops serving the First Bulgarian Empire

History
Their resurgence in the greater Khorasan province is identified with the Kerey, a Kazakh group of the middle zhuz Argyns said to descend from the Keraites.
They became influential there in the 18th century, after their leader, Amir Khan, was made governor of Mashad under Ahmad Shah Durrani in 1749. Their political power peaked in the early 19th century under the leadership of Eshaq Khan Qaraei-Torbati. Eshaq Khan had submitted to Agha Mohammad Khan Qajar in 1795, but under Fath-Ali Shah Qajar he  achieved de facto autonomy from the central Qajar government, seizing control of Mashad in 1813. But soon later, in 1816, Eshaq Khan's tribal alliance fell apart and he was killed in Mashad.

Esḥaq Khan was succeeded by his son Moḥammad Khan, who managed to retain "a sort of semi-independent existence" But in the second half of the 19th century, the Karai chiefs lost most of their wealth and influence. George N. Curzon, who visited the area in 1889, described the region as "terribly decimated both by Turkmen ravages and by the great famine".

Demographics
A small Qarai population is found in Kerman Province, comprising some 420 households as of 1957, centered on the village of Tangu. and in Fars Province, where clans using the name Qarai are found within the Qashqai, Khamsa and  Mamasāni tribal confederacies.
Oberling (1960:101) cites Iranian Army Files of 1956 according to which the Qarai of Kerman and Fars were moved there from Khorasan during the Safavid dynasty.

See also
Ethnicities in Iran
Khorasani Turks
Qizilbash
Qaraylar
Keraites
Qarai
Karai

References

P. Oberling, "Karāʾi", Encyclopedia Iranica, vol. XV, Fasc. 5 (2002), pp. 536–537.
P. Oberling, The Turkic Peoples of Southern Iran, Cleveland, 1960.

Ethnic groups in Iran
Tatar people
Khorasan